InterCommunity Health Network (IHN) is an integrated care coordinated care organization (CCO) created by the state of Oregon in 2012 to allow for local and regional distribution and coordination of healthcare to segments of the state's population covered under the Oregon Health Plan. It was created, with the rest of the CCOs, through Oregon Senate Bill 1580.

Its approximately fifty five thousand members are part of the Medicaid segment of the population of the Benton, Lincoln, and Linn counties and works with health care providers, hospitals, and local community groups to integrate healthcare services and contain cost increases through improved quality of care. 

IHN is partnered with Samaritan Health Services, a non-profit healthcare organization consisting of five Oregon hospitals, for the distribution of this healthcare to its members.

References

External links
 

Healthcare in Oregon
Managed care
Medicare and Medicaid (United States)
2012 establishments in Oregon
Medical and health organizations based in Oregon